Robert C. Jensen (October 29, 1928 – November 27, 2011) was an American farmer and politician.

Jensen was born in Minneapolis, Minnesota and was a grain and dairy farmer. He went to Lakeview High School and Inver Hills Community College. Jensen moved to New Market, Minnesota in 1949. He then moved in Lakeville, Minnesota in 1957 and to Rosemount, Minnesota in 2001. He lived in Lakeview, Minnesota, with his wife and family, but his postal address was Farmington, Minnesota. He served as mayor of Lakeview, Minnesota, and on the Lakeview village board. Jensen also served on the Ramsey County Commission and was a Democrat. He also served on the Minnesota Mississippi River Parkway Commission and the Dakota County Planning Commission. Jensen served in the Minnesota House of Representatives from 1975 to 1978 and from 1983 to 1984, and from 1987 to 1988. Jensen died from colon cancer at The Lodge hospice in Rosemont, Minnesota.

References

1928 births
2011 deaths
Politicians from Minneapolis
People from Lakeville, Minnesota
Farmers from Minnesota
Democratic Party members of the Minnesota House of Representatives
Mayors of places in Minnesota
Minnesota city council members
Deaths from colorectal cancer
Deaths from cancer in Minnesota